Iowa County is a county located in the U.S. state of Iowa. As of the 2020 census, the population was 16,662. The county seat is Marengo.

Iowa County is one of seven counties in the United States to share the same name as the state they are located in. The other six counties are Arkansas County, Hawaii County, Idaho County, New York County, Oklahoma County, and Utah County.

History
Iowa County was formed on February 17, 1843.  It was named for the Iowa River, which flows through the county.

The first courthouse was a log cabin built in 1847.  This was rented by the county until 1850 when a second courthouse was completed.  In 1861 construction of a third courthouse was begun.  The current courthouse was built in 1892 after the county had outgrown the previous one.

Iowa County is home to the Amana Colonies, a group of settlements of German Pietists, comprising seven villages. Calling themselves the Ebenezer Society or the Community of True Inspiration (German: die Gemeinde der wahren Inspiration), they first settled in New York state near Buffalo in what is now West Seneca. However, in order to live out their beliefs in more isolated surroundings they moved west, to Iowa County in 1855, living a communal life until the mid-1930s. Today, Amana is a major tourist attraction known mainly for its restaurants and craft shops, and the colonies as a whole have been listed as a National Historic Landmark since 1965.

Geography

The county is intersected by the Iowa River and the north fork of the English River.

Major highways
 Interstate 80
 U.S. Highway 6
 U.S. Highway 151
 Iowa Highway 21
 Iowa Highway 149
 Iowa Highway 220
 Iowa Highway 212

Adjacent counties
Benton County  (north)
Linn County  (northeast)
Johnson County  (east)
Washington County  (southeast)
Keokuk County  (south)
Poweshiek County  (west) 
Tama County (northwest)

Demographics

2020 census
There were 7,341 housing units, of which 6,811 were occupied.

2010 census
There were 7,258 housing units, of which 6,677 were occupied.

2000 census

As of the census of 2000, there were 15,671 people, 6,163 households, and 4,301 families residing in the county.  The population density was 27 people per square mile (10/km2).  There were 6,545 housing units at an average density of 11 per square mile (4/km2).  The racial makeup of the county was 98.70% White, 0.17% Black or African American, 0.06% Native American, 0.30% Asian, 0.03% Pacific Islander, 0.36% from other races, and 0.38% from two or more races.  0.97% of the population were Hispanic or Latino of any race.

There were 6,163 households, out of which 32.80% had children under the age of 18 living with them, 60.10% were married couples living together, 6.60% had a female householder with no husband present, and 30.20% were non-families. 25.90% of all households were made up of individuals, and 12.50% had someone living alone who was 65 years of age or older.  The average household size was 2.50 and the average family size was 3.03.

In the county, the population was spread out, with 26.40% under the age of 18, 6.30% from 18 to 24, 27.80% from 25 to 44, 22.40% from 45 to 64, and 17.10% who were 65 years of age or older.  The median age was 39 years. For every 100 females there were 95.00 males.  For every 100 females age 18 and over, there were 93.20 males.

The median income for a household in the county was $41,222, and the median income for a family was $48,946. Males had a median income of $31,220 versus $24,652 for females. The per capita income for the county was $18,884.  About 3.40% of families and 5.00% of the population were below the poverty line, including 4.50% of those under age 18 and 5.40% of those age 65 or over.

Politics

In the 2008 US presidential election, a nearly equal number of Iowa County voters voted for each major candidate.

Communities

Cities

Ladora
Marengo
Millersburg
North English
Parnell
Victor
Williamsburg

Census-designated places
Amana
Conroy
East Amana
High Amana
Homestead
Middle Amana
South Amana
West Amana

Other unincorporated communities
Genoa Bluff
Koszta

Townships

English
Greene
Hartford
Hilton
Iowa
Lincoln
Marengo
Pilot
Sumner
Troy
Washington
York
New Liberty

Population ranking
The population ranking of the following table is based on the 2020 census of Iowa County.

† county seat

Education
The following public school districts have areas in Iowa County:
Belle Plaine Community School District, Belle Plaine
Benton Community School District, Van Horne
Clear Creek–Amana Community School District, Oxford
Deep River–Millersburg Community School District, Millersburg
English Valleys Community School District, North English
H-L-V Community School District, Victor
Iowa Valley Community School District, Marengo
Williamsburg Community School District, Williamsburg

See also

National Register of Historic Places listings in Iowa County, Iowa

References

External links

Iowa County's website
Iowa County Genealogy Iowa GenWeb website

 
1843 establishments in Iowa Territory
Populated places established in 1843